The 1936 All-Ireland Junior Hurling Championship was the 19th staging of the All-Ireland Junior Championship since its establishment by the Gaelic Athletic Association in 1912.

Limerick entered the championship as the defending champions, however, they were beaten in the Munster Championship.

The All-Ireland final was played on 13 September 1936 at Croke Park in Dublin, between Westmeath and Waterford, in what was their first ever meeting in a final. Westmeath won the match by 2-05 to 3-01 to claim their first ever championship title.

Results

All-Ireland Junior Hurling Championship

All-Ireland semi-finals

All-Ireland final

References

Junior
All-Ireland Junior Hurling Championship